University of South Asia may refer to the following:
University of South Asia (Bangladesh)
University of South Asia (Pakistan)